Cedric Vaughan English (born 13 September 1973) is a Scottish cricketer, originally from South Africa. An allrounder, he is a right-handed middle-order batsman and opening bowler.

English made his first-class debut when he was just 17, playing for Griqualand West in South African domestic cricket. He went on to play for Western Province and Boland before moving to Scotland in 1998 as a professional for club side Carlton

After qualifying for Scottish residence he became a member of their 2004 Intercontinental Cup side which won the competition. He was also part of Scotland's triumphant ICC Trophy side in 2005.

References

External links
 

1973 births
Living people
South African cricketers
Boland cricketers
Western Province cricketers
Griqualand West cricketers
Scottish cricket coaches
Scottish cricketers